Brazil has participated in all the FINA World Swimming Championships (25 m) since the beginning in 1993. Brazil is 7th on the all time medal table.
In the first time, Brazil win the overall medal table in 2014 World Swimming Championships (25 m) in Doha, Qatar.

Medalists

 Swimmers who participated in the heats only and received medals.

Medal tables

By championships

By gender

By athlete

Only athletes with at least three medals

Best Finishes

Men

Women

Mixed

See also
 Brazil at the World Aquatics Championships

References

World Aquatics Championships (25m)